Route 10, or Highway 10, can refer to routes in the following countries:

International
 European route E10 
 European route E010

Argentina
 La Pampa Provincial Route 10

Australia

Queensland 
 Smith Street Motorway (Queensland)
 Scenic Highway (Queensland)

South Australia 
 Adelaide-Mannum Road

Tasmania 
 Lyell Highway, Zeehan Highway, Murchison Highway, Tasmania

Austria
 Tauern Autobahn

Brazil
 BR-010

Cameroon
 Route 10

Canada
 Alberta Highway 10
 British Columbia Highway 10
 Manitoba Highway 10
 New Brunswick Route 10
 Newfoundland and Labrador Route 10
 Northwest Territories Highway 10 (Inuvik-Tuktoyaktuk Highway)
 Nova Scotia Trunk 10
 Ontario Highway 10
 Prince Edward Island Route 10
 Quebec Autoroute 10
 Quebec Route 10 (former)
 Saskatchewan Highway 10
 Yukon Highway 10

China
  G10 Expressway

Costa Rica
 National Route 10

Czech Republic
 D10 Motorway
 I/10 Highway; Czech: Silnice I/10

Hong Kong
 Route 10 (Hong Kong)

Hungary
 M10 expressway (Hungary)
 Main road 10 (Hungary)

India

Iraq
 Highway 10 (Iraq)

Israel
 Highway 10 (Israel)

Ireland
 N10 road (Ireland)

Italy
 Autostrada A10
 RA 10

Japan
 Japan National Route 10
  Higashikyushu Expressway 
  Miyazaki Expressway

Jordan

Korea, South
 Namhae Expressway
National Route 10

Malaysia
 Malaysia Federal Route 10

New Zealand
  New Zealand State Highway 10

Paraguay
 National Route 10

Philippines
 N10 highway (Philippines)

Romania
 Drumul Naţional 10
 A10 motorway (Romania)

Russia
 M10 highway (Russia)

Saudi Arabia
  Highway 10 (Saudi Arabia)

South Africa
 N10 road (South Africa)

United Kingdom
 M10 motorway (Great Britain) (Former)
 A10 road

United States
 Interstate 10
 Interstate 10 Business
 U.S. Route 10
 U.S. Route 10S (Montana) (former)
 U.S. Route 10S (Minnesota) (former)
 U.S. Route 10N (Montana) (former)
 U.S. Route 10N (Minnesota) (former)
 New England Interstate Route 10 (former)
 Alabama State Route 10
 Alaska Route 10
 Arkansas Highway 10
 California State Route 10 (former)
 County Route A10 (California)
 County Route E10 (California)
 County Route G10 (California)
 County Route J10 (California)
 County Route S10 (California)
 Colorado State Highway 10
 Connecticut Route 10
 Delaware Route 10
 Florida State Road 10
 Georgia State Route 10
 Hawaii Route 10 (former)
 Illinois Route 10
 Indiana State Road 10
 Iowa Highway 10
 K-10 (Kansas highway)
 Kentucky Route 10
 Louisiana Highway 10
 Maine State Route 10
 Maryland Route 10
 Massachusetts Route 10
 M-10 (Michigan highway)
Minnesota State Highway 10 (1920–1933) (former)
 Missouri Route 10
 Montana Highway 10
 Nebraska Highway 10
 Nevada State Route 10 (former)
 New Hampshire Route 10
 New Jersey Route 10
 New Jersey Route 10N (former)
 County Route 10 (Monmouth County, New Jersey)
 New York State Route 10
 County Route 10 (Albany County, New York)
 County Route 10 (Allegany County, New York)
 County Route 10 (Cattaraugus County, New York)
County Route 10B (Cayuga County, New York)
County Route 10C (Cayuga County, New York)
 County Route 10 (Chemung County, New York)
 County Route 10 (Chenango County, New York)
 County Route 10 (Columbia County, New York)
 County Route 10 (Dutchess County, New York)
 County Route 10 (Franklin County, New York)
 County Route 10 (Genesee County, New York)
 County Route 10 (Niagara County, New York)
 County Route 10 (Oneida County, New York)
 County Route 10 (Ontario County, New York)
 County Route 10 (Orange County, New York)
 County Route 10 (Oswego County, New York)
 County Route 10 (Putnam County, New York)
 County Route 10 (Schenectady County, New York)
 County Route 10 (Schuyler County, New York)
 County Route 10 (St. Lawrence County, New York)
 County Route 10 (Suffolk County, New York)
 County Route 10 (Ulster County, New York)
 County Route 10 (Wyoming County, New York)
 County Route 10 (Yates County, New York)
 North Carolina Highway 10
 North Dakota Highway 10
 Ohio State Route 10
 Oklahoma State Highway 10
 Oklahoma State Highway 10C
 Oregon Route 10
 Pennsylvania Route 10
 Rhode Island Route 10
 South Carolina Highway 10
 South Dakota Highway 10
 Tennessee State Route 10
 Texas State Highway 10
 Texas State Highway Loop 10 (former)
 Texas State Highway Spur 10
 Farm to Market Road 10
 Texas Park Road 10
 Texas Recreational Road 10
 Utah State Route 10
 Vermont Route 10
 Virginia State Route 10
 Washington State Route 10
 Primary State Highway 10 (Washington) (former)
 West Virginia Route 10
 Wisconsin Highway 10 (former)
 Wyoming Highway 10

Territories
 Guam Highway 10
 Puerto Rico Highway 10
 U.S. Virgin Islands Highway 10

Uruguay 
  Route 10 Juan Díaz de Solís

See also 
 List of A10 roads
 List of highways numbered 10A